Hate Songs in E Minor is the debut studio album by British rock band Fudge Tunnel, released in 1991 by Earache. It followed in the wake of two critically acclaimed singles ("Fudge Tunnel" in 1989 and "The Sweet Sound of Excess" in 1990, both on Pigboy/Winyl Solution), after which the group were signed to Earache. The album consists of 11 songs, 9 of which were written by the band and 2 covers: "Sunshine of Your Love", originally recorded by the band Cream, while the last track on the disc, "Cat Scratch Fever" was originally recorded by Ted Nugent. The album is also dedicated to Nugent. The track "Hate Song" was included on a six-disc, 100-plus-track box set titled Metal: A Headbanger's Companion.

Hate Songs in E Minor presented a new and broader approach by the label following the success of more experimental and electronic Godflesh. Fudge Tunnel could also be considered a British response to the sound of bands like Melvins, Nirvana and Swans in the US. Early pressings of the LP edition of the album included a bonus 7" containing the track "Joined at the Dick".

Critical reception
Spin wrote that the album is "hardcore meets guitar rock at its loudest and finest".

Track listing

Personnel
Fudge Tunnel
Alex Newport - guitars, vocals
David Ryley - bass
Adrian Parkin - drums, percussion

Production
Colin Richardson - production
Fudge Tunnel - production
John Cornfield - recording, engineering

References

External links
Hate Songs in E Minor at Discogs

1991 debut albums
Fudge Tunnel albums
Earache Records albums
Albums produced by Colin Richardson
Albums produced by Alex Newport